Demario Odell Warren (born April 20, 1985) is an American football coach and former player. He last served as the head football coach at Southern Utah University from 2016 to 2021, compiling a record of 21–42. Warren accepted the head coaching position on January 11, 2016, after serving as the team's defensive coordinator for two years. Following the 2021 season, Warren and Southern Utah mutually agreed to part ways. On January 12, 2022, it was announced Demario will be hired by Boise State to coach cornerbacks.

Head coaching record

References

1985 births
Living people
American football running backs
Southern Utah Thunderbirds football coaches
UC Davis Aggies football players
University of Phoenix alumni
People from Fairfield, California